Band V (meaning Band 5) is the name of a radio frequency range within the ultra high frequency part of the electromagnetic spectrum. It is not to be confused with the V band in the extremely high frequency part of the spectrum.

Sources differ on the exact frequency range of UHF Band V. For example, the Broadcast engineer's reference book and the BBC define the range as 614 to 854 MHz. The IPTV India Forum define the range as 582 to 806 MHz and the DVB Worldwide website refers to the range as 585 to 806 MHz. Band V is primarily used for analogue and digital (DVB-T & ATSC) television broadcasting, as well as radio microphones and  services intended for mobile devices such as DVB-H.  With the close-down of analog television services most countries have auctioned off frequencies from 694 MHz and up to 4G cellular network providers.

Television

Australia
In Australia UHF channel allocations are 7 MHz wide.  Band V includes channels 36 to 69, with base frequencies of 585.5 MHz to 816.5 MHz.  More details are available on the television frequencies page.

New Zealand
In New Zealand UHF channel allocations are 8 MHz wide.  Band V includes digital channels 36 to 49, with base frequencies of 594.0 MHz to 698.0 MHz.  More details are available on the television frequencies page.

United Kingdom
In the UK, Band V allocations for television  are 8 MHz wide, traditionally consisting of 30 channels from UHF 39 to 68 inclusive. There is also a channel 69. Semi-wideband aerials of the group E type cover this entire band. However, aerials of types group B and group C/D will cover the lower and upper halves of Band V respectively with higher gain than a group E.

The following table shows TV channel allocations in Band V in the UK.
Rows with a yellow background (channels 61–68 inclusive) indicate channels cleared for 4G mobile broadband services following an auction run by the UK spectrum regulator Ofcom in January 2013 and the subsequent award of spectrum (which also included channel 69) to the winning mobile operators on 1 March 2013.
Rows with an orange background (channels 49–60 inclusive) indicate channels that are due to be cleared so that from 2022 they can be used by mobile data services. The decision to reallocate these channels was published by Ofcom on 19 November 2014.

United States
698–806 MHz: Was auctioned in March 2008; bidders got full use after the transition to digital TV was completed on June 12, 2009 (formerly UHF TV channels 52–69).  T-Mobile USA, licensee of "block A" (channels 52 and 57), began using its frequency allotment in 2015, in media markets where TV stations on 51 either did not exist or relocated early.
614–698MHz (TV channels 38–51) will be auctioned in March 2016.

References 

Radio spectrum
Broadcast engineering